The 'National Association of Boards of Pharmacy. The NABP membership is composed of 54 active members and 12 associate members. Active member boards include all 50 United States, the District of Columbia, Guam, Puerto Rico, and the Virgin Islands. Associate member boards are The Bahamas, and 10 Canadian provinces. Australia was formerly an associate member but was removed in 2020.

NABP supports its member boards of pharmacy by offering:
 Examinations that assess pharmacists’ competency to practice pharmacy. These examinations include the North American Pharmacist Licensure Examination (NAPLEX) and the Multistate Pharmacy Jurisprudence Examination (MPJE).
 License transfer program that alleviates the administrative burden on boards by verifying pharmacists’ applications for license transfer,
 Accreditation programs that create uniform standards and perform inspections to supplement board staff and alleviate financial burden.
 Many other services that provide pertinent resources to assist the boards of pharmacy as they work to protect the public health each day.

History
The NABP originated in the United States in 1904.

In 1999, the NABP developed the Verified Internet Pharmacy Practice Sites (VIPPS) program to accredit online pharmacies.

In 2004, the NABP developed the Verified-Accredited Wholesale Distributors (VAWD) program to accredit Wholesale Distributors and to help protect the public from the threat of counterfeit drugs.

In 2011, the NABP implemented a data exchange that allows authorized pharmacists, law enforcement agents, and regulatory boards to access patient-specific controlled substance prescription information. Known as NABP PMP InterConnect®, the platform provides a single page summary of patient's drug seeking activities across state lines. As of 2018, authorized users in 42 states have accessed data using the system in order to prevent drug abuse and drug diversion.

Top-level domain .pharmacy
In 2014, the NABP launched the generic top-level domain (gTLD) .pharmacy, "to provide consumers around the world a means for identifying safe, legal, and ethical online pharmacies and related resources".

The impartiality of the domain has been questioned, because Eli Lilly and Company, Merck & Co., and Pfizer are the main contributors to the NABP application.  Previously, that application was challenged by Public Citizen, Knowledge Ecology International, and the Canadian International Pharmacy Association.

References

Pharmacy organizations in the United States
Medical and health organizations based in Illinois
Organizations established in 1904
1904 establishments in the United States